Deramas toshikoae is a butterfly of the family Lycaenidae. Its forewing length is 15–16 mm. It is endemic to the Philippines. It is rare species and found on Mindanao, Leyte and Mindoro islands.

References

 , 1981: New Lycaenid Butterflies from the Philippines. Tyô to Ga. 32 (1,2): 63-82.
, 1995. Checklist of the butterflies of the Philippine Islands (Lepidoptera: Rhopalocera) Nachrichten des Entomologischen Vereins Apollo Suppl. 14: 7-118.

 , 2012: Revised checklist of the butterflies of the Philippine Islands (Lepidoptera: Rhopalocera). Nachrichten des Entomologischen Vereins Apollo, Suppl. 20: 1-64.

Butterflies described in 1981
Deramas